James Sicily (born 6 January 1995) is a professional Australian rules footballer and the current captain of the Hawthorn Football Club in the Australian Football League (AFL).

Early career
Sicily's junior career was spent playing for the Keilor Football Club. In 2013, Sicily kicked 26 goals from 16 games for the Western Jets and represented Vic Metro at the National Championships.

AFL career
Sicily was drafted by the Hawthorn Football Club with the fifty-sixth pick in the 2013 AFL draft. In 2014, he was widely considered Box Hill’s best player in the losing grand final, kicking a team-high three goals, and finishing with 15 disposals and five marks.

He made his AFL debut against  in round 2, 2015 starting as the sub. He came on replacing the injured James Frawley in the first quarter and later kicked a goal. He went on to play three games for the year.

He was named as the round 13 nominee for the Rising Star after kicking a career high five goals and recording 13 disposals and 5 marks. 2016 was regarded as Sicily's breakout season.

During the 2017 season, Sicily, who had previously been a forward, was shifted to the backline, after being dropped from the team while playing as a forward. He impressed in that position, but nonetheless at the end of the season was still the subject of some uncertainty around his position in the team. On August 22, 2017, Sicily signed a three-year contract extension keeping him at the club until 2020.

Sicily was suspended for one match in the early stages of the 2018 season for kneeing Geelong captain Joel Selwood. Notwithstanding this, Sicily was widely tipped to be on track for a nomination to the All-Australian team of that year before breaking bones in his wrist in Round 17, only returning during the finals series. Despite this injury, Sicily had a season widely perceived as excellent, and was considered to have potential to become one of the league's best defenders.

Sicily had another good season in 2019, being selected in the extended All-Australian squad for that year, the only Hawthorn player to do so. He was considered especially important to Hawthorn's defence. At the end of the season, he re-signed with the club till at least the year 2022.

On 16 May 2022, Sicily announced that he had agreed to a 5-year contract extension with Hawthorn, tying him to the club until at least the end of 2027.

In February 2023, Sicily was appointed the 38th captain of Hawthorn, with the 28-year-old succeeding the retired Ben McEvoy who served in the role for two seasons.

On-field temperament
Sicily is widely regarded and known for having a short temper, something he himself has acknowledged.

Statistics
Updated to the end of the 2022 season.

|-
| 2014 ||  || 41
| 0 || — || — || — || — || — || — || — || — || — || — || — || — || — || — || 0
|-
| 2015 ||  || 21
| 3 || 4 || 1 || 19 || 19 || 38 || 11 || 3 || 1.3 || 0.3 || 6.3 || 6.3 || 12.7 || 3.7 || 1.0 || 0
|-
| 2016 ||  || 21
| 22 || 30 || 18 || 168 || 84 || 252 || 100 || 43 || 1.4 || 0.8 || 7.6 || 3.8 || 11.5 || 4.6 || 2.0 || 3
|-
| 2017 ||  || 21
| 19 || 13 || 9 || 204 || 148 || 352 || 131 || 22 || 0.7 || 0.5 || 10.7 || 7.8 || 18.5 || 6.9 || 1.2 || 1
|-
| 2018 ||  || 6
| 16 || 6 || 1 || 264 || 109 || 373 || 114 || 26 || 0.4 || 0.1 || 16.5 || 6.8 || 23.3 || 7.1 || 1.6 || 8
|-
| 2019 ||  || 6
| 22 || 3 || 2 || 352 || 112 || 464 || 158 || 32 || 0.1 || 0.1 || 16.0 || 5.1 || 21.1 || 7.2 || 1.5 || 8
|-
| 2020 ||  || 6
| 11 || 2 || 1 || 146 || 50 || 196 || 62 || 9 || 0.2 || 0.1 || 13.3 || 4.5 || 17.8 || 5.6 || 0.8 || 0
|-
| 2021 ||  || 6
| 0 || — || — || — || — || — || — || — || — || — || — || — || — || — || — || 0
|-
| 2022 ||  || 6
| 22 || 1 || 3 || 418 || 106 || 524 || bgcolor=CAE1FF | 190† || 32 || 0.0 || 0.1 || 19.0 || 4.8 || 23.8 || bgcolor=CAE1FF | 8.6† || 1.5 || 7
|- class="sortbottom"
! colspan=3| Career
! 115 !! 59 !! 35 !! 1571 !! 628 !! 2199 !! 766 !! 167 !! 0.5 !! 0.3 !! 13.7 !! 5.5 !! 19.1 !! 6.7 !! 1.5 || 27
|}

Notes

Honours and achievements
Team
 Minor premiership: 2015

Individual
 Hawthorn captain: 2023–
 Peter Crimmins Medal: 2022
 22 Under 22 team: 2017
  most promising player: 2016
 AFL Rising Star nominee: 2016
 Victoria Australian rules football team: 2020

References

External links

Hawthorn Football Club players
Box Hill Football Club players
Western Jets players
1995 births
Living people
Australian rules footballers from Victoria (Australia)
Australian people of Italian descent